Joe Palooka Meets Humphrey is a 1950 film in the Joe Palooka series. It was directed by Jean Yarbrough.

Plot
When their car veers off the road en route to their honeymoon, Joe Palooka and new wife Anne are rescued by a sweet lummox, Humphrey Pennyworth, who has amazing strength.

Knobby Walsh turns up, concerned about newspaper reports that Joe intends to retire from boxing. He spends the night, causing a rift between Joe and an annoyed Anne in the process.

A charity fight is arranged in which Joe will raise funds for a boys' club. When his scheduled opponent, Johnson, makes an insulting remark, Humphrey flattens him. Johnson's shifty manager Belden now wants Humphrey to fight Joe instead, but all the sweet Humphrey wants to do is eat.

Belden tells lies about Joe, persuading a gullible Humphrey to step into the ring.  Belden's thugs  knock out Knobby, who has been running a scheme of his own, pretending to be Lord Cecil, a British boxing manager. Joe's punches barely affect Humphrey, but having been kept from eating all day, Humphrey becomes dizzy from hunger. Joe is able to defeat him, Belden is arrested and Humphrey's sister Prunella brings him a pie.

Cast
 Leon Errol as Knobby / Lord Cecil
 Joe Kirkwood, Jr. as Joe Palooka
 Elyse Knox as Anne
 Robert Coogan as Humphrey
 Jerome Cowan as Belden
 Joe Besser as Carlton
 Donald MacBride as Mayor

External links
Joe Palooka Meets Humphrey at TCMDB

1950 films
American black-and-white films
Films directed by Jean Yarbrough
Films based on American comics
Joe Palooka films